Atif Bashir (born 1 March 1971) is a Pakistani field hockey player. He retired in 2002 after an injury. He is married and has two kids. He has 6 sisters and 3 brothers who are older than him. His father died in 1980 and his mother died in 2012. He currently resides in Lahore, Punjab, Pakistan. He competed in the men's tournament at the 2000 Summer Olympics.

References

External links
 

1971 births
Living people
Pakistani male field hockey players
Olympic field hockey players of Pakistan
Field hockey players at the 2000 Summer Olympics
Place of birth missing (living people)
Asian Games medalists in field hockey
Asian Games bronze medalists for Pakistan
Medalists at the 1998 Asian Games
Field hockey players at the 1998 Asian Games
2002 Men's Hockey World Cup players